The Synchronized Position Hold Engage and Reorient Experimental Satellite (SPHERES) are a series of miniaturized satellites developed by MIT's Space Systems Laboratory for NASA and US Military, to be used as a low-risk, extensible test bed for the development of metrology, formation flight, rendezvous, docking and autonomy algorithms that are critical for future space missions that use distributed spacecraft architecture, such as Terrestrial Planet Finder and Orbital Express.

Each SPHERES satellite is an 18-sided polyhedron, with a mass of about 4.1 kg and a diameter of about 21 cm. They can be used in the International Space Station as well as in ground-based laboratories, but not in the vacuum of space. The battery-powered, self-contained units can operate semi-autonomously, using CO2-based cold-gas thrusters for movement and a series of ultrasonic beacons for orientation. The satellites can communicate with each other and with a control station wirelessly. The built-in features of the satellites can be extended using an expansion port.

From 2006, three SPHERES units are being used in the International Space Station for a variety of experiments. The SPHERES Guest Scientist Program allow scientists to conduct new science experiments using SPHERES units, and the Zero Robotics Program allow students to participate in annual competitions that involve developing software to control SPHERES units.

The SPHERES program is expected to continue until 2017, and possibly further.

The SPHERES project lead to a newer project called Astrobee.

Development 

The initial development of SPHERES started in 1999, by a team of students at Massachusetts Institute of Technology, as part of an aerospace engineering program. The concept of the satellite was conceived when Professor David Miller challenged the students to develop a device similar to the combat training remote seen in the 1977 movie Star Wars Episode IV: A New Hope and more recently in Star Wars: Episode II – Attack of the Clones. Several prototypes were developed during the course of the program, and were tested in ground laboratories as well as in parabolic flights using NASA's reduced gravity aircraft.

After the initial development, the SPHERES program was taken over by MIT's Space Systems Laboratory. In collaboration with Aurora Flight Sciences, the design was refined and six flight-ready satellites were built, out of which three were delivered to the International Space Station.

The SPHERES project is primarily funded by Defense Advanced Research Projects Agency (DARPA).

Specifications

Structure and physical characteristics 
Each SPHERES satellite resembles an 18-sided polyhedron. The aluminum structure of the satellite is enclosed in a semi-transparent plastic shell. The shell is red, blue, orange or black in color, to help with easy identification. The three satellites in the International Space Station are red, blue and orange. Each unit has a maximum diameter of 22.9 cm and has a mass of 4.16 kg including the consumables.

Processing and communication 
A Texas Instruments C6701 DSP running at 167 MHz serves as the onboard computer. Flight software and experiment related instructions are written in C programming language.

The satellites can communicate with each other using a 916.5 MHz, 16kbit/s radio link. Communication with the control station (a laptop computer) is done using an 868.35 MHz, 16kbit/s radio link. SPHERES satellites are able to connect to the International Space Station's on-board Wi-Fi network for tasks that require a higher data bandwidth.

Sensors and navigation 
SPHERES satellites determine their position and attitude by using 23 on-board ultrasonic receivers (Murata MA40S4R) and 5 external ultrasonic reference beacons. The ultrasonic time-of-flight measurements from the external beacons to the on-board receivers are used to calculate the satellite's position with respect to the external reference frame.

For rapid determination of position, the ultrasonic time-of-flight information is supplemented with the data from on-board accelerometers (3x Honeywell QA-750 single-axis accelerometers) and gyroscopes (3x Systron Donner QRS14 single-axis rate gyroscopes).

Power and actuation 
SPHERES satellites are powered using two non-rechargeable 12v battery packs. Each battery pack consists of eight 1.5v AA battery cells that are spot-welded in series.

The satellites are able to translate in the micro-gravity environment with 6 degrees-of-freedom, using twelve cold-gas thrusters that use liquid CO2 as propellant. The liquid CO2 are stored in a small on-board container, similar to those that are used in paintball guns. The CO2 is converted to a gaseous state before being ejected through the thrusters for propulsion. Desired thrust is achieved through pulse modulation of thrust solenoids.

The maximum linear acceleration of the satellites is 0.17m/s2, with an accuracy of 0.5 cm. The maximum angular acceleration is 3.5 rad/s2, with an accuracy of 2.5 degrees.

Testing and support facilities 
SPHERES program utilizes supporting facilities located at NASA's Ames Research Centre.

3 DoF Laboratory 

The 3 DoF laboratory facilitates simultaneous testing of up to three SPHERES satellites on a flat, nearly friction-less granite surface. The satellites are mounted on air carriages – stands that eject a stream of CO2 to create a cushion of air – allowing the units to translate on X and Y axis, and rotate on Z axis.

MicroGravity Test Facility (MGTF) 
The MicroGravity Test Facility (MGTF) facilitates testing of a single mobile SPHERES satellite, using six degrees-of-freedom. In this, the unit is held by a gimbal with 3 DoF, which is suspended from a translation crane with 3 DoF. The laboratory is able to provide a navigational reference frame in a similar configuration as in the International Space Station using five ultrasonic beacons, and the output of cold gas thrusters are analysed to simulate the expected movement in a micro-gravity environment.

Flight Assembly Laboratory 
The Flight Assembly Laboratory is used to prepare and test consumables – battery packs and liquid CO2 containers – used by the SPHERES units.

Individual cells of the battery packs are tested, spot-welded in series and tested again as a pack. The battery packs are discarded after use.

Spent CO2 containers are returned to the Flight Assembly Laboratory for re-filling and safety testing before being flown back to the International Space Station.

Delivery to the International Space Station
The delivery of SPHERES satellites to the International Space Station were originally planned for 2003. However, due to the loss of Space Shuttle Columbia in February 2003, the delivery did not take place until 2006.

The first SPHERES unit was delivered to ISS by the unmanned resupply mission Progress M-56 (ISS-21P) during April 2006. The second unit was delivered by the Space Shuttle mission STS-121 in July 2006. The final unit was delivered by the Space Shuttle mission STS-116 in December 2006.

The SPHERES experiment aboard the International Space Station commenced on 18 May 2006.

Experiments

SmartSPHERES 

SmartSPHERES experiment equipped the three SPHERES satellite aboard the International Space Station with Nexus S smartphones that were delivered via the Space Shuttle mission STS-135. Each satellite was enhanced through the use of processing power, wireless networking, camera, sensors and the touch sensitive display of the connected smartphone. The availability of the Android operating system's source code enabled the devices to be used as a compact, low-cost, low-power computers.

The experiment studies the use of SPHERES satellites to conduct autonomous and remotely operated environmental and inventory surveys aboard the Space Station, with the aim of reducing the astronaut's time spent on routine tasks. Knowledge gained will also help the development of future space vehicles that could perform extravehicular activities, and assist astronauts with their tasks.

The SmartSPHERES experiment is managed by the Intelligent Robotics Group of the Ames Research Center with funding from Enabling Technology Development and Demonstration program of NASA's Exploration Systems Mission Directorate.

SPHERES-VERTIGO 

The SPHERES-VERTIGO (SPHERES-Visual Estimation and Relative Tracking for Inspection of Generic Objects) experiment aims to develop software and hardware that can generate three-dimensional maps of cooperative or non-cooperative objects using computer vision, and navigate relative to such objects solely by reference to the generated maps.

As part of the experiment, new Simultaneous Localization and Mapping (SLAM) algorithms are developed and tested.

To facilitate SPHERES-VERTIGO experiment, each SPHERES satellite aboard the ISS are equipped with an add-on "goggle" – a device connected to SPHERES using the expansion port, and carries a stereo camera, ultrasonic sensors, a single-board computer, high-speed communication facilities and batteries.

Technologies developed will be used in future autonomous space vehicles that can operate alone or in groups to map asteroids, inspect tumbling satellites or de-orbit space debris.

The experiment is part of the SPHERES Integrated Research Experiments (InSPIRE) program, funded by DARPA.

DOD SPHERES-RINGS 

DOD SPHERES-RINGS (Department of Defense SPHERES-Resonant Inductive Near-field Generation System) experiment aims to develop software and hardware capable of Electromagnetic Formation Flight (EMFF) and wireless power transfer in microgravity environment.

The experiment uses two hardware assemblies connected to SPHERES satellites, consisting of aluminum resonant coils, coil housing with fans, electronics and batteries.

Individual SPHERES units are maneuvered with respect to each other by generating controlled attractive, repulsive and shear forces using the electromagnetic coils. The same coils are used to wirelessly transfer power between SPHERES satellites through resonant inductive coupling. Software algorithms that avoid collision between satellites are also developed as part of the experiment.

Knowledge gained through the experiment will help the development of propellant-free, plume-free clustered space vehicles, increase their operating lifetime, reduce spacecraft mass and associated operating risks.

SPHERES-Slosh 
Article: SPHERES-Slosh

Use in education

Zero Robotics 

Zero Robotics is an annual international competition conducted by MIT, where participating student teams program the SPHERES satellites to solve a specific challenge. The competition is held under two tiers; the middle school tournament and the high school tournament.

The initial rounds of the competition are conducted via simulations. The finalists' programs are loaded into SPHERES satellites aboard the International Space Station, and are executed by astronauts. The event is broadcast live to MIT, Europe and Australia.

See also 
 AERCam Sprint
 Artificial intelligence
 Micro-g environment
 Robotics
 Electromagnetic Formation Flight
 Scientific research on the International Space Station
 Spherical robot

References

External links 

 SPHERES website at NASA.gov
 SPHERES website  at MIT.edu
 SPHERES Test Sessions 
 SPHERES page  at MIT.edu
 MIT Space Systems Lab
 Aurora Flight Sciences
 "Space Station lightsabre-sparring hoverdroids to be upgraded" at The Register

International Space Station experiments
Massachusetts Institute of Technology
Space robots
Small satellites
Satellite series